Themes for Dying Earth is the sixth studio album by Canadian musician Teen Daze. It was released in February 2017 under Flora Records.

Track listing

References

2017 albums